Živojin "Žika" Lazić (12 February 1876 7 November 1958) was a Serbian and Yugoslav politician who served as the first Ban of Vardar Banovina from 1929 to 1932 and the Minister of the Interior from 1932 to 1934.

Biography 
Lazić was born in 1876 in Svračkovci, near Gornji Milanovac. He graduated from the Faculty of Law, University of Belgrade and later specialized in the field of national security in Germany, Italy and Austria-Hungary. From 1919 to 1921, he was the head of the Public Security Department of the Ministry of the Interior.

In September 1923, he founded the Association against Bulgarian Bandits, an organization whose goal was to prevent the support of the Macedonian population for the Internal Macedonian Revolutionary Organization (IMRO). Prime Minister Ljubomir Davidović openly disagreed with Lazić's decision to appoint former IMRO members Stojan Mishev and Grigor Ciklev to head the organization, to which Lazić replied that "he did not find a better mechanism than the mutual extermination of former and current Bulgarian komitadjis." In 1923, he also led the Yugoslav delegation to a conference that led to the signing of the Treaty of Niš, and was then appointed Deputy Minister of the Interior. In 1927, he participated as a public prosecutor in the Skopje Student Trial against the Macedonian Youth Secret Revolutionary Organization members. On 13 July 1928, under the orders of Ivan Mihailov, IMRO member Ivan Momchilov carried out an unsuccessful assassination attempt against Lazić. Momchilov entered Lazić's office in Belgrade, shot him in the head, and then committed suicide. Lazić was badly wounded, but still survived.

In 1929, Živojin Lazic was appointed Ban of the Vardar Banovina with its headquarters in Skopje. He was in the leadership of the local board of the Soko organization and Narodna Odbrana. In the period from 2 July 1932 to 20 December 1934, he served the Minister of the Interior in the government led by the Yugoslav National Party.

At the end of World War II and the establishment of the new communist regime, Lazić left Yugoslavia and went overseas to Canada. He died in Montréal in 1958 at the age of 82, where he was buried.

References

Literature 
 
 

1876 births
1958 deaths
People from Gornji Milanovac
University of Belgrade Faculty of Law alumni
Government ministers of Yugoslavia
Yugoslav National Party politicians
Yugoslav emigrants to Canada
Serbian emigrants to Canada
Bans of the Kingdom of Yugoslavia
Shooting survivors
Burials at Mount Royal Cemetery